The 1980 Australian Open was a tennis tournament played on outdoor grass courts at the Kooyong Lawn Tennis Club in Melbourne, Australia. It was the 69th edition of the Australian Open. The women’s tournament was held 24-30th of November 1980 and the men’s was held from 26 December 1980 through 4 January 1981. The singles titles were won by American Brian Teacher and Czechoslovakian Hana Mandlíková.

Seniors

Men's singles

 Brian Teacher defeated  Kim Warwick 7–5, 7–6(7–4), 6–3  
• It was Teacher's 1st and only career Grand Slam singles title.

Women's singles

 Hana Mandlíková defeated  Wendy Turnbull 6–0, 7–5 
• It was Mandlíková's 1st career Grand Slam singles title.

Men's doubles

 Mark Edmondson /  Kim Warwick defeated  Peter McNamara /  Paul McNamee 7–5, 6–4  
 It was Edmondson's 2nd career Grand Slam title and his 2nd Australian Open title. It was Warwick's 2nd career Grand Slam title and his 2nd Australian Open title.

Women's doubles

 Betsy Nagelsen /  Martina Navratilova defeated  Ann Kiyomura /  Candy Reynolds 6–4, 6–4 
• It was Nagelsen's 2nd and last career Grand Slam doubles title.
• It was Navratilova's 7th career Grand Slam doubles title and her 1st title at the Australian Open.

Mixed doubles
The competition was not held between 1970 and 1986.

Juniors

Boys' singles
 Craig Miller defeated  Wally Masur 7–6, 6–2

Girls' singles
 Anne Minter defeated  Elizabeth Sayers 6–4, 6–2

References

External links
 Official website Australian Open

 
 

 
1980 in Australian tennis
December 1980 sports events in Australia
January 1981 sports events in Australia
1980,Australian Open